Shirin Su Rural District is a rural district (dehestan) in Shirin Su District, Kabudarahang County, Hamadan Province, Iran. At the 2006 census, its population was 10,322, in 2,129 families. The rural district has 16 villages.

References 

Rural Districts of Hamadan Province
Kabudarahang County